Bleeders Digest (2015) is the ninth full-length album by Say Hi and was released on September 18, 2015.

Track listing
 "The Grass Is Always Greener" – 3:34
 "It's a Hunger" – 3:19
 "Creatures of the Night" – 3:09
 "Transylvania (Torrents of Rain, Yeah)" – 3:03
 "Lover's Lane (Smitten With Doom)" – 2:43
 "Teeth Only for You" – 3:24
 "Time Travel, Pt. 2" – 0:21
 "Pirates of the Cities, Pirates of the Suburbs" – 3:46
 "Galaxies Will Be Born" – 3:46
 "Volcanoes Erupt" – 3:38
 "Cobblestones'" – 2:48

References

2015 albums
Say Hi albums
Barsuk Records albums